Hipólito Chaiña Contreras (February 3, 1954 – 22 February 2021) was a Peruvian physician and politician.

Biography
Chaiña was born in Puno on February 3, 1954. He studied human medicine at the National University of San Agustín in the city of Arequipa between 1973 and 1985. Since then he has worked in his profession in the city of Arequipa in social security hospitals (EsSalud) from 1988 to 2019.

Political career 
His first political participation occurred in the general elections of 2006 when he ran for Democratic Force as a candidate for congress for the department of Arequipa without obtaining representation. In the municipal elections of that same year he unsuccessfully tempted the mayor of the Paucarpata district. He also participated in the 2018 regional elections as a candidate for the regional governorship of Arequipa for the Independent Regional Movement Arequipa Mía without obtaining the election.

He served as a member of Congress since 2020. He died from COVID-19 during the COVID-19 pandemic in Peru.

References

1954 births
2021 deaths
20th-century Peruvian physicians
Peruvian politicians
Deaths from the COVID-19 pandemic in Peru
21st-century Peruvian physicians

People from Puno Region